Peter Lomongin (1944-2006) was an Anglican bishop in Uganda: He was  Bishop of Karamoja from 1987 until his death.

Longmongin was educated at Uganda Christian University and ordained in 1973. He served in the Diocese of Soroti until 1976 when he became Archdeacon of Karamoja.

References

Anglican bishops of Karamoja
20th-century Anglican bishops in Uganda
Anglican archdeacons in Africa
Uganda Christian University alumni
1944 births
2006 deaths
21st-century Anglican bishops in Uganda